Robert McClure was an Irish explorer of the Arctic.

Bob McClure is former Major League Baseball pitcher.

Bob or Robert McClure may also refer to:
 Robert A. McClure (1897–1957), American soldier and psychological warfare specialist
 Robert B. McClure (1896–1973), American soldier
 Robert Baird McClure (1900–1991), Canadian physician and Christian missionary
 Bob McClure (footballer) (1925–2003), Australian rules footballer
 Bob McClure (Negro leagues) (1891–1931), American Negro leagues baseball player
 Bob McClure (politician) (1913–1983), Australian politician

See also 
 Rob McClure (born 1982), American actor